Board of Finance or Finance Board may refer to:

 Federal Housing Finance Board in the United States
 Campaign Finance Board of New York City in the United States
 Local boards of finance throughout New England in the United States
 Board of Finance of imperial China between the Tang and Qing dynasties

See also
 Ministry of Finance